Han Seok-Hee (born 1 October 1998) is a professional footballer from South Korea. An attacker, as of 2020 he plays for Suwon Samsung Bluewings FC in the Korea Republic's K-League.

Career
You started his career with Suwon Samsung Bluewings.

On 1st July 2022, he has been loaned to Jeonnam Dragons of K League 2, traded with Jeong Ho-jin.

References

External links 
 

1996 births
Living people
Association football forwards
South Korean footballers
Suwon Samsung Bluewings players
Jeonnam Dragons players
K League 1 players
K League 2 players
People from Gangneung
Sportspeople from Gangwon Province, South Korea